Monaco competed at the World Games 2017 in Wroclaw, Poland, from 20 July 2017 to 30 July 2017.

Competitors

Boules Sports
Monaco  has qualified at the 2017 World Games:

Lyonnaise Men's Singles Precision Shooting- 1 quota

References 

Nations at the 2017 World Games
2017 in Monégasque sport
Monaco at multi-sport events